Sergio Navarro Barquero (born 17 October 1979) is a Spanish football manager, and the current assistant manager of Athletic Bilbao.

Career
Navarro played in Villarreal CF and another teams in Tercera División and Divisiones Regionales de Fútbol until his retirement in the age of 26.

In 2005 he began a coaching career in CD Castellón sportive school as a coach of the different ages teams. After he continued as a Head of methodology in the Russian FC Rubin Kazan from 2011 until 2013 and in Villarreal CF from 2014 until 2017.

In June 2017, he signed a contract with the Ukrainian Premier League's FC Karpaty Lviv and was named as a manager of this Ukrainian team.

Managerial statistics

References

External links

Profile at Footballfacts (in Russian)

1979 births
Living people
Footballers from Huelva
Spanish footballers
Association football fullbacks
Villarreal CF players
CD Pozoblanco players
SCR Peña Deportiva players
Spanish football managers
Spanish expatriate football managers
FC Karpaty Lviv managers
Ukrainian Premier League managers
Expatriate football managers in Ukraine
Spanish expatriate sportspeople in Ukraine
Expatriate football managers in Russia
Spanish expatriate sportspeople in Russia